Susanabad (also Romanized as Sūsanābād) is a village in Esfandan Rural District, in the Central District of Komijan County, Markazi Province, Iran. At the 2006 census, its population was 56, in 16 families.

References 

Populated places in Komijan County